Fruition is a full service digital marketing agency based in Denver, Colorado that provides web design & development and Internet marketing services to multiple international corporations. The company is also known for its Google Penalty Checker tool.

History
Founded in 2000 by current CEO Brad Anderson, Fruition initially began as an SEO company. It later expanded to the larger niche of digital marketing. The company's core services now include SEO, website development & design, app development, digital marketing, and brand & reputation management. Fruition was first trademarked in 2002, and registered with the World Intellectual Property Organization in 2007.

Google Penalty Checker
In 2013, Fruition released its Google Penalty Checker tool, which has notably been the subject of multiple news reports. It is a proprietary tool that uses statistical analysis and third-party data to determine if a website had been hit by a Google penalty, as well as which particular update caused it. Once the tool is granted access to a Google Analytics account, it uses algorithms involving bounce rates, organic traffic, new vs. repeat visits, and page views, among other data, to evaluate a possible Google penalty due to a recent update. It provides a graph of all the updates and the percentage of their effect on the site. The tool is free for up to two sites, after which pricing is applicable.

The tool has been noted to be beneficial for businesses that do not stay up to date with Google updates.

References

External links
Official website
Google penalty checker tool

Companies based in Denver